Ernest Jackson may refer to:

Ernest Jackson (gridiron football) (born 1986), American gridiron football wide receiver
Ernest Jackson (footballer) (1914–1996), English footballer
Ernest Jackson (priest), Canadian Anglican priest

See also
Earnest Jackson (born 1959), American football running back
Francis Ernest Jackson (1872–1945), British painter, draughtsman, poster designer and lithographer